The 14th Battalion (Royal Montreal Regiment), CEF was a battalion of the First World War Canadian Expeditionary Force.

History 
The 14th Battalion was authorized on 1 September 1914 and embarked for Great Britain on 27 and 29 September 1914.  It disembarked in France on 15 February 1915, where it fought as part of the 3rd Canadian Brigade, 1st Canadian Division in France and Flanders until the end of the war. The battalion disbanded on 15 September 1920.

The battalion fought at the centre of the 3rd Brigade during the attack on Vimy Ridge and faced strong opposition.  Several German strongpoints had survived the creeping barrage and their machine-guns caught the 14th in the open.  By the end of the day the battalion's casualties were 92 killed and 173 wounded.

Perpetuations 
The battalion is perpetuated by The Royal Montreal Regiment.

Battle honours 

 Ypres 1915, 17
 Gravenstafel
 St. Julien
 Festubert, 1915
 Mount Sorrel
 Somme, 1916
 Pozieres
 Thiepval
 Ancre Heights
 Arras 1917, '18
 Vimy, 1917
 Arleux
 Scarpe, 1917, '18
 Hill 70
 Passchendaele
 Amiens
 Drocourt-Quéant
 Hindenburg Line
 Canal du Nord
 Pursuit to Mons
France and Flanders, 1915-18

See also 

 List of infantry battalions in the Canadian Expeditionary Force

References

Battalions of the Canadian Expeditionary Force
Military units and formations established in 1914
1914 establishments in Canada